Stainton is a hamlet in the Carlisle District, in the English county of Cumbria. It is near the city of Carlisle. Circa 1870, it had a population of 63 as recorded in the Imperial Gazetteer of England and Wales.

See also

Listed buildings in Kingmoor

References

External links
  Cumbria County History Trust: Stanwix (nb: provisional research only - see Talk page)

Hamlets in Cumbria
City of Carlisle